Daniel or Danny Young may refer to:
 Daniel Young (politician), Australian politician
 Daniel Young (cricketer), English cricketer
 Danny Young (basketball) (born 1962), American basketball player
 Danny Young (actor) (born 1986), British actor
 Danny Young (pitcher, born 1971) (born 1971), American baseball player
 Danny Young (pitcher, born 1994) (born 1994), American baseball player
 Dan Young, British actor
 Daniel Young (artist)
 Daniel Young House, Maine

See also
Dani Young, Australian singer-songwriter

Danny Jung, Danish footballer